Arusei is a surname of Kenyan origin that may refer to:

Moses Kimeli Arusei (born 1983), Kenyan marathon runner and 2006 Seoul International Marathon winner
Peninah Arusei (born 1979), Kenyan long-distance track and road runner
Simon Arusei (born 1977), Kenyan long-distance track and cross country runner
Stephen Arusei Kipkorir (1970–2008), Kenyan middle-distance runner and Olympic medallist

Kenyan names